Joshua Media Ministries, also known as the Kingdom of God Global Church or Kingdom Family Church, is a ministry and church based in Taylor, Michigan. Former members have described it as a cult, and its leader, self-described "Apostle" David E. Taylor, has attracted accusations of being a sexual predator and criticism for his lavish lifestyle and high-profile real estate acquisitions. Taylor, who is Black, claims that these accusations are a racially-motivated social media smear campaign.

Taylor claims that his ministerial efforts have "resulted in entire drug rings being dismantled, sex-slave trafficking being broken, blinded eyes opening, deaf ears hearing, the lame walking and the dead being brought back to life!". The church has released a video of a member claiming that Taylor raised her from the dead. He also claims to have met Jesus Christ face-to-face, and to be able to instruct his followers to share that experience.

Accusations of culthood
Former members of the Kingdom of God Global Church have accused the church of physical, financial, and sexual abuse, including aggressive fundraising quotas, sleep deprivation, welfare fraud, and blackmail. Neighbors to the church's residential properties have reported heavy security and surveillance presence; city officials in Chesterfield, Missouri have cited the church for operating commercial enterprises in residential zones, and various Michigan police departments have reported frequent visits to the church's main office and residential facilities for wellness checks, missing-persons reports, mental health commitments, and a 2017 bomb threat. 

Other former members, including gospel singer Vicki Yohe and Taylor's ex-wife Tabitha Taylor, claim that Taylor uses his position in the church to lure women into sexual relationships, including married members of his congregation. Yohe's account of her relationship with David E. Taylor included lavish gifts when the relationship was going well, and threats of revenge porn and being cursed with cancer when it was going poorly.

One member of the church donated over $1 million. In a subsequent divorce proceeding, Taylor was subpoenaed for a videotaped deposition to detail his church's spending. In the deposition, he described a $2.8M residence in the St. Louis area, three luxury vehicles (including a limousine), and a 2013-2014 clothing budget of approximately $30,000. He explained the clothing expenditures as due to his frequent travel and "sweating through all [his] clothes."

Ministry Watch rates Joshua Media Ministries an 'F' ("Withhold Giving") for its lack of financial transparency, with a score of 12/100 for donor confidence.

Real-estate purchases
In 2015, Taylor announced plans to purchase the St. Louis-area Jamestown Mall for redevelopment as a religious complex, including a hotel, sports arena, office space, and convention center. He claimed that he had a $10 million donation from Karlos Dansby and $400 million in financing arranged, along with a contract to purchase the property from Macy's for $1 million. Dansby denied that he had made or pledged the donation, and the church was unable to begin either the site purchase or redevelopment. Instead, St. Louis County transferred the property to its port authority in 2017.

Taylor unsuccessfully sued St. Louis County, claiming that it had undermined his efforts with slow approvals, and Macy's, for reneging on the alleged purchase agreement. The mall's 145-acre site remains under management of the Port Authority as of 2022.

In 2021, the Kingdom of God Global Church purchased an abandoned 10,000 square foot mansion in Wildwood, Missouri owned by the rapper Nelly. At the time the Church also owned a nearby five-bedroom, nine-bathroom house in nearby Chesterfield. It claimed that these homes were intended for use in a drug and alcohol rehabilitation program.

In 2022, the Church also purchased an $8.3 million estate from Tampa Bay Buccaneers co-owner Darcie Glazer Kassewitz in Tampa, Florida's Avila neighborhood. The estate included a 28,893 square-foot main house and a 2,620 square-foot guest house.

References

Churches in Detroit
Churches in St. Louis
Cults
Taylor, Michigan